Neville Longbottom is a fictional character in J. K. Rowling's Harry Potter book series. He is described as a round-faced Gryffindor student in the central character Harry Potter's year. Throughout the series, Neville is often portrayed as a bumbling and disorganised character, and a rather mediocre student, though he is highly gifted at Herbology. However, the character's personality appears to undergo a transition after he joins Dumbledore's Army in Harry Potter and the Order of the Phoenix. The encouragement he receives gives him confidence in his magical abilities, turning him into a more competent wizard. Eventually, Neville becomes the leader of Dumbledore's Army during Harry, Ron and Hermione's absence searching for Horcruxes. Neville is instrumental in the downfall of Lord Voldemort and eventually destroys the final Horcrux, which allows Harry to defeat The Dark Lord once and for all. Neville is portrayed in the film adaptations by Matthew Lewis.

Character development
Although a secondary character in the first four books, Neville appears often in the role of comic relief. He is one of Harry's strongest supporters over the course of the series, and becomes close friends with Ron, Hermione, Ginny, and Luna as well. Neville plays a significant part in the two final books and the fight against Lord Voldemort, destroying the final Horcrux, Nagini, with the Sword of Gryffindor. The Sword appearing for Neville in his time of need is Neville's justification that he is a true Gryffindor, as he had always doubted his placement in the house since the beginning, wondering why he wasn't sorted into Hufflepuff.

Rowling revealed in an interview that "there's a lot of Neville in me—this feeling of just never being quite good enough... I felt that a lot when I was younger". For that reason, she wanted Neville to do something brave in Harry Potter and the Philosopher's Stone, in which Neville "finds true moral courage in standing up to his closest friends—the people who are on his side" towards the climax of the novel. She also said in that interview that this was "...a very important moment for me too in the first book".

Appearances

First four books
Neville Longbottom first appears in Philosopher's Stone before the initial journey in the Hogwarts Express, in which he is seen being accompanied by his grandmother looking for his toad pet Trevor. He befriends Harry, Ron and Hermione, and takes part in some of the trio's first adventures. Neville makes one significant contribution in his first year at Hogwarts: by attempting to stand up to the trio when he sees them about to break the rules and possibly do more harm to Gryffindor house, he earns the respect of Albus Dumbledore. For this act, Dumbledore mentions him at the end of year dinner, pointing out the bravery required to stand up to one's friends, and awards him the final 10 points necessary for Gryffindor house to beat Slytherin.

In Harry Potter and the Chamber of Secrets, despite being a Pure-blood wizard, Neville fears that Slytherin's monster will attack him because he is "almost a Squib", as he is a poorly skilled student. However, in Harry Potter and the Prisoner of Azkaban, new Defence Against the Dark Arts teacher Remus Lupin is one of the first to help Neville develop his true power by asking him to confront and defeat a Boggart, which Neville successfully does. In Harry Potter and the Goblet of Fire, it is revealed that Neville was raised by his grandmother because his parents were tortured to the point of insanity by Barty Crouch, Jr., Rodolphus, Rabastan, and Bellatrix Lestrange with the Cruciatus Curse for information on Voldemort's whereabouts following his downfall. During one of Crouch Jr.'s Defence Against the Dark Arts lessons while impersonating Alastor Moody, Neville is terrified upon seeing Crouch Jr. demonstrate the effects of the curse on a spider. He invites Hermione to the Yule Ball but is declined, so Neville is accompanied by Ginny at the Ball instead.

Harry Potter and the Order of the Phoenix
In Harry Potter and the Order of the Phoenix Neville's magical abilities improve dramatically under the tutelage of Harry during meetings of Dumbledore's Army, and he then devotes himself to Harry's training regimen. He also receives far greater characterisation than he has in the past, with Harry, and thus the reader, coming to understand him on a deeper level, beginning when Harry's friends see the state of Neville's parents at St Mungo's Hospital for Magical Maladies and Injuries.

In the climax of the book, Neville participates in the battle in the Department of Mysteries, in which he accidentally breaks the prophecy made about Harry and Voldemort. Dumbledore, to whom the prophecy was originally made, explains that it concerns "the Chosen One", a wizard that would have the power to vanquish Voldemort. This "Chosen One" would be born "as the seventh month dies", and thus the prophecy could refer to either Neville, born on 30 July 1980, or Harry, born on 31 July. According to Rowling, this "does not give Neville either hidden powers or a mysterious destiny ... Neville remains the tantalising 'might-have-been.' "

Harry Potter and the Half-Blood Prince
Neville receives a new wand in Harry Potter and the Half-Blood Prince as the old one, which was actually his father's, was broken during the struggle with Death Eaters in the previous book. During the train ride to Hogwarts, Neville is invited by Horace Slughorn to join the Slug Club, but apparently does not pass Slughorn's first test as he is not invited again. It is revealed that Neville achieved an "Outstanding" in Herbology, and he did well in Defence Against the Dark Arts and Charms, earning an "Exceeds Expectations." Neville wants the D.A. meetings to continue, as he feels they have helped him and the others to improve their skills, however they stop as Harry says there is no need as they now have a "proper teacher". When a group of Death Eaters guided by Draco Malfoy attack the castle, Neville answers the call for help, and he fights against the Death Eaters once again, though he suffers minor injuries. During Dumbledore's funeral Neville is accompanied and assisted by Luna, and Harry feels a "great rush of affection" for them because they were the only two D.A. members to help Harry, Ron, Hermione, and Ginny in the struggle with the Death Eaters.

Harry Potter and the Deathly Hallows
With Harry's absence and the control of Hogwarts in the hands of Severus Snape and Death Eaters Alecto and Amycus Carrow in Harry Potter and the Deathly Hallows, Neville spends much of his seventh year at Hogwarts as the resistance leader against Voldemort's takeover. Together with Ginny and Luna, Neville reactivates Dumbledore's Army, stepping into the leadership position in Harry's absence and helping students who were tormented under the new regime. Neville reveals that the Carrows beat him and that the Death Eaters targeted his grandmother when Neville was acting up at school. Neville goes into hiding in the Room of Requirement, which he shows an incredible ability to control. Upon Harry's return to Hogwarts, Neville sends messages to the D.A., which in turn gathers the Order of the Phoenix.

During the Battle of Hogwarts, Neville is spotted twice by Harry using his knowledge of Herbology to help ward off the attackers. He later helps Oliver Wood carry the body of Colin Creevey. When Voldemort returns with Harry's apparently lifeless body, Neville defies him, and decapitates Nagini with the Sword of Godric Gryffindor (which he draws from the Sorting Hat), thus destroying the final Horcrux and making Voldemort mortal once again. When the battle goes to the Great Hall, he assists Ron in taking down Fenrir Greyback. After the battle is won, Neville is surrounded by a group of admirers.

Epilogue
In the epilogue of Deathly Hallows, Ginny mentions that Neville has gone on to be the Herbology professor at Hogwarts. In an interview, Rowling also mentioned that he shows off his D.A. coin to many admiring students and tells them about his adventures. Rowling revealed more information about Neville when she stated that he married Hannah Abbott, a Hufflepuff classmate, who became the landlady of the Leaky Cauldron. The couple live over the pub, a fact that Rowling thought people would find "particularly cool".

Film portrayal
Neville has been played by Matthew Lewis in all of the Harry Potter films to date. Lewis' portrayal of Neville has been "clowned up", as he wears yellow and crooked false teeth, two-sizes-too-big shoes and has plastic bits placed behind his ears in order to make them stick out more. Prior to the release of the fifth film, Lewis commented on Neville's character development that he thinks "it's amazing that the character of Neville has really shaken off his klutz image (to an extent.) It very good to see him finally being a help as opposed to making things worse, I'm looking forward to the 5th film, it will be interesting to almost play a different character." When asked if he feels related to Neville, Lewis replied that he is "clumsy and terribly forgetful" just like his character is, but that he does not have "the same nervous disposition as Neville", and that it is interesting to play somebody that, despite being picked on at school, still does the right thing.

Appearance in other material
Although Neville does not appear onstage in Harry Potter and the Cursed Child, he is mentioned as part of a pivotal plot element.  Time travelers Albus Potter and Scorpius Malfoy prevent Cedric Diggory from winning the Tri-Wizard Tournament, in order to save his life.  But Diggory is publicly humiliated, setting him on a path to becoming a Death Eater.  When Scorpius returns to his own time, he learns that Diggory's only significant act as a Death Eater was to murder Neville, who was considered unimportant; but Neville's absence from the Battle of Hogwarts results in a timeline where Harry was killed, Voldemort conquered the wizarding world, and Albus no longer exists.

Characterisation

Outward appearance
The narrative describes Neville as round-faced. In Prisoner of Azkaban, Harry draws some physical comparison between Neville and Peter Pettigrew. In a 2000 interview, Rowling recalled a conversation with a reader, to whom she described Neville as "short and plump and blond".

Personality
For most of the first part of the series, Neville is described as lacking self-confidence and being shy. In the third book, his boggart is revealed to be Professor Snape, whom Neville is terrified of because of the treatment the potions teacher gives to the boy. Rowling said that the "worst, shabbiest thing you can do" as a teacher is to bully students. Along with Luna, Neville is isolated within Hogwarts for most of the series. Although Professor Lupin is one of the first to encourage Neville, the character develops more self-confidence since the fifth book. In the final book, the situation pushes Neville's personality to unseen limits as he becomes the resistance leader within Hogwarts and is greatly admired by his fellows. However, since the first book Neville has displayed great courage, a feature that is recognised by Dumbledore for standing up to his own friends, and valued by Rowling above all other virtues.

Magical abilities and skills
During the first books of the series, Neville is portrayed as an incompetent wizard and as poorly skilled at school (with the only exception of Herbology). The character himself reveals in the second book that it was even feared by his family, especially his grandmother, that he was a Squib during his childhood. Neville's family is relieved, therefore, when he receives his letter inviting him to Hogwarts. Neville's magical abilities greatly improve in the fifth instalment, due to the character joining Dumbledore's Army, a group dedicated to practice Defence Against the Dark Arts. In Half-Blood Prince, Neville receives a new wand made of cherry wood and unicorn hair, as his previous wand (which was actually his father's) was destroyed while fighting Death Eaters in Order of the Phoenix. The wand appears to have added further improvement to Neville's school performance.

Family
Neville is a pure-blood wizard born to Frank and Alice Longbottom, who were prominent Aurors and also members of the Order of the Phoenix during the first war against Lord Voldemort. It is stated by Dumbledore that both of them had "thrice defied" Voldemort by 1981. Their success, however, was cut short, as Frank and Alice were tortured to the point of insanity with the Cruciatus Curse by a group of Death Eaters consisting of Barty Crouch, Jr., Bellatrix Lestrange, her husband Rodolphus, and his brother Rabastan. The torture of the Longbottoms is remembered by the Order as one of the most horrific crimes committed by Voldemort's followers. Since then, Frank and Alice reside in a closed ward of St Mungo's Hospital for Magical Maladies and Injuries. Neville visits Frank and Alice over the holidays, but neither of them recognise him as their son.

Augusta Longbottom, Neville's paternal grandmother, raised him from a young age. Early on, it is established that Neville is terrified of his grandmother, who is a very strict disciplinarian, a perfectionist, and a no-nonsense witch, especially towards Neville, and sometimes complains of his lack of talent. She appears to want Neville to follow his father's example, regardless of his desires or suitability. Deathly Hallows is a definite turning point for the relation between Augusta and her grandson. Towards the climax of the book, it is revealed that the Death Eaters targeted Augusta when Neville was acting as leader of the reformed Dumbledore's Army. The Ministry official Dawlish is sent to arrest her but does not succeed and winds up in hospital when she apparently fights back before going on the run. Augusta also arrives to the Battle of Hogwarts to assist her grandson. When Harry tells her that Neville is fighting Death Eaters, she replies, "Naturally." Bolstered by Neville's leadership of the D.A. during his seventh year at Hogwarts, Augusta ultimately becomes extremely proud of him.

Reception
Due in large part to the character's impressive character arc throughout the series, Neville is often regarded as one of the greatest characters in the Harry Potter mythos. IGN ranked Neville as the 6th greatest character from the franchise stating, "Neville Longbottom is the quintessential dimwit-turned-hero. When we first meet him at Hogwarts, Neville is a shy introvert who is simply not that good at magic. In fact, those close to Neville quietly wondered if he might nearly be a Squib, someone born into a wizarding family without magic powers. He's lovable, sure, but his early misadventures don't explicitly foreshadow the valiant defender of Hogwarts that he would ultimately become." Neville was always considered to be a fan favourite character in the first four books where he provided a mainly secondary role, before The Order of the Phoenix where he became one of the main characters and eventual leader of Dumbledore's Army. Fans of the series admire Neville's bravery and desire to avenge his parents and assist Harry, Ron and Hermione. Neville's role in the prophecy in Order of the Phoenix is frequently referred to in a hypothetical scenario where Neville was the Chosen One rather than Harry. It is often suggested that Voldemort chose Harry over Neville because of Harry's half-blood status. In the end, both were essential to Voldemort's downfall, fulfilling the possibility that both Harry and Neville were, in fact, the Chosen One. While Harry delivered the final blow to destroy Voldemort, Neville destroyed the final Horcrux which allowed Harry to end Voldemort. When asked about whether or not Neville was the chosen one, Neville's portrayer Matthew Lewis stated, "I get asked about the prophecy an awful lot, and Neville's potential as 'The Chosen One'. The contrast between the two people is that Harry was the reluctant hero who never wanted that on his shoulders and whatnot, but he just felt like he had to do it. Whereas Neville was kind of the hero that no one expected to be a hero, but still came out the other side being exactly that. Could Neville have been the Chosen One? Could he have achieved what Harry did? I think yeah, absolutely. But the thing is: nobody in this series did anything on their own. Even Voldemort didn't get to his level of power on his own. Harry saved the day because he had friends and people who loved him. I think, had it been Neville he would have had a similar experience. Both the characters are incredibly and fiercely loyal and that breeds loyalty in other people. So I think Neville would've had plenty of people getting his back, Harry would've been there in Neville's role getting his back. So I think, yeah, he'd have pulled through in the end."

References

External links

Neville Longbottom at the Harry Potter Lexicon

Harry Potter characters
Child characters in film
Child characters in literature
Literary characters introduced in 1997
Teenage characters in literature
Teenage characters in film
Male characters in film
Male characters in literature
Fictional British people
Fictional wizards
Fictional members of secret societies
Fictional horticulturists and gardeners
Fictional schoolteachers
Fictional botanists
Fictional war veterans
Fictional swordfighters
Fictional professors
Film characters introduced in 2001